The Russian Pillage, is the name for the action of the Imperial Russian Fleet toward the Swedish civilian population along the Swedish east coast, as well as expeditions and the raids of single unit in the inland, during the finishing years of the Great Northern War in 1719–1721. The purpose was to pillage, sack, and burn to force the Swedish regime to concessions during the peace negotiations on Åland. The Swedish representative, Georg Heinrich von Görtz, was at the time stalling the negotiations in hope of military support from Great Britain. Peter the Great, on the other hand, wished for a swift end to the war, which would make it possible for him to focus on inner reform.

In the summer of 1719 a Russian fleet consisting of 132 galleys and several smaller boats, totalling 26000 men, assaulted Stockholm archipelago. The Russian fleet pillaged along the coast of Uppland almost as far north as Gävle, and the coast of Södermanland as far south as Norrköping. The archipelago was severely devastated by the assaults. On several of the larger islands, almost all buildings were burnt down. The entire city of Trosa was burnt to the ground, save for the city church and bell tower. After receiving reinforcements, the Russian fleet attempted to attack Stockholm but were defeated on 12 August 1719.

In 1720 Russian troops razed Umeå, and in 1721 the cities of Hudiksvall, Sundsvall, Söderhamn, Härnösand and Piteå.

The Russian forces were stopped after a Swedish counterattack at the Battle of Grengam (Swedish: Slaget vid Ledsund) of which 43 of the total 61 galleons were destroyed. This resulted in the Swedish east coast being saved. More similar encounters were repeated until the peace of Treaty of Nystad.

Notes

References
 Ullman, Magnus (2006). Rysshärjningarna på Ostkusten sommaren 1719. Stockholm: Bokförlaget Magnus Ullman. Libris 10203442. 

Great Northern War
1719 in Sweden
1720 in Sweden
1721 in Sweden
Sweden during the Age of Liberty